Den norske Bank or DnB was a Norwegian bank that existed between 1990 and 2003 when it merged with Gjensidige NOR to form DnB NOR (now DNB ASA). The bank's headquarters were in Bergen, Norway.

DnB was created as a merger between Bergen Bank and Den norske Creditbank in 1990 after a major downturn in the economy, especially affecting the banks, who lost vast amounts of money due to misheld loans and falling housing prices. The state held a majority ownership in the bank in addition to its being listed on the Oslo Stock Exchange. In 1996, DnB bought Vital Forsikring and in 1999 it merged with Postbanken.

External links

 DNB web site

Defunct banks of Norway
Companies formerly listed on the Oslo Stock Exchange
Formerly government-owned companies of Norway
Companies based in Bergen
Banks established in 1990
Banks disestablished in 1999
1990 establishments in Norway
1999 disestablishments in Norway